Euexia is a genus of moths in the family Geometridae described by Prout in 1915.

Species
 Euexia percnopus Prout, 1915
 Euexia aora Prout, 1922

References

Geometridae